Miss Switch to the Rescue is a 1982 animated television special and a sequel to The Trouble with Miss Switch (1980) produced by Ruby-Spears Productions. It is based on the 1981 children's book of the same name by Barbara Brooks Wallace and originally aired in two parts on ABC Weekend Special series on January 16 and 23, 1982. It also features the final role for actor Hans Conried, who died only a few weeks before the first part aired.

The special was rebroadcast on ABC in April/May 1982, as well as June 1983, February 1985, July 1986, April 1987 and February 1989.

Synopsis
Rupert Brown and Amelia Daley receive a mysterious package from a spooky old crone: a ship inside a bottle with a miniature man aboard. Rupert opens the bottle, unwittingly releasing the evil warlock Mordo, who quickly kidnaps Amelia. Rupert calls upon the good witch Miss Switch to use her magic powers to rescue Amelia. Miss Switch conjures The Witches Encyclopedia  and traces Mordo and Amelia to the year 1640, when good witches imprisoned Mordo in the bottle. Traveling back in time on her broomstick, Miss Switch and Rupert eventually find Amelia on Mordo's pirate ship, where the warlock is about to administer his evil potion to mayor Daley. They manage to rescue Amelia, but Mordo is still able to transform the mayor into a troll. Upon their return to the present, Amelia and Rupert learn from Miss Switch's magic encyclopedia that the real power behind this diabolical plot is Saturna, meddling from afar on the Island of Fire and Ice. As Saturna vows to get her revenge, Amelia begins to fade away and then vanishes – a disappearance Miss Switch knows will be permanent unless Amelia is saved by sunset.

Miss Switch rewinds the clock to bring back Amelia, then uses the additional time to mix an antidote potion. Miss Switch uses ingredients in the school science lab, with the addition of unicorn dust. Mordo kidnaps the classroom of children on his flying pirate ship. An expanded rescue mission unfolds, culminating with the troll Thaddeus drinking the antidote, transforming back into Mayor Daley, who is in fact Amelia's 300-years-removed grandfather. Angered by the turn of events, Saturna battles Mordo with magic, causing a massive cave-in that traps them both in ice. Miss Switch safely returns all the children to school, magically ensuring the other classmates forget the whole incident. When Rupert asks Miss Switch if they'll ever see her again, she and Bathsheba vanish on her broomstick, leaving behind the response "Who Knows?" on the chalkboard.

Voices
 Janet Waldo as Miss Switch
 Eric Taslitz as Rupert Brown
 Nancy McKeon as Amelia Daley
 Hans Conried as Mordo, the Warlock
 Walker Edmiston as Witch's Book / Old Salt / Mayor
 June Foray as Bathsheba / Saturna
 Anne Lockhart as Teacher / Barmaid
 Hal Smith as Smirch
 Philip Tanzini as Banana / Conrad
 Willie Tyler as himself - Host

Production credits
Executive Producers: Joe Ruby & Ken Spears
Directed by: Charles A. Nichols
Written by: Sheldon Stark
Based on the Characters Created by: Barbara Brooks Wallace
Voices: Janet Waldo, Eric Taslitz, Nancy McKeon, Hans Conried, Alan Dinehart, Walker Edmiston, June Foray, Anne Lockhart, Hal Smith, Philip Tanzini
Director of Production Design: Ric Gonzalez
Supervising Story Director: Gordon Kent
Story Direction: Ron Campbell
Models: Alan Huck
Voice Direction: Alan Dinehart
Layout Supervision: Larry Huber
Layout: Kathleen Carr, Kurt Conner, Hak Ficq, George Goode, Fred Irvin, Lew Ott, Mario Piluso, Aaron St. John, Wallace Sides
Background Layout Supervision: David High
Background Layout: John F. Guerin, Bruce Zick
Animation Supervision: Jay Sarbry
Animation: Frank Andrina, Ed Barge, Tom Barnes, Bob Bemiller, Oliver Callahan, Rudy Cataldi, Rick Leon, Hicks Lokey, Mircea Mantta, Costi Mustatea, Bob Nesler, Margaret Nichols, Zeon Davush, Ed Demattia, Joan Drake, Hugh Fraser, Al Green, Terry Harrison, Fred Hullmich, Aundre Knutson, Barney Posner, Bill Pratt, Joanna Romersa, Don Ruch, Kunio Shimamura, Ken Southworth
Assistant Animation Supervision: John Boersema
Production Coordinator: Loretta High
Xerography: Star Wirth
Checking and Scene Planning: Paul Strickland
Ink and Paint Supervision: Alison Victory
Studio Manager: Jeff Cooke
Background Styling: Eric Semones
Backgrounds Painted by: Katsuyoshi Hozumi, Dennis Durrel, Gary Selvaggio, P.S. Lewis, Peter Van Elk, Bob Schaefer, Dennis Venizelos, Gloria Wood, Tom Woodington
Color Key: Bunny Semones
Title Design: Bob Schaefer
Assistants to the Executive Producers: Erika Grossbart, Kayte Kuch
Production Assistants: Joyce Benson, Bryna Melnick, Kathy Rose
Music: Dean Elliott
Musical Supervision: Paul DeKorte
Supervising Film Editor: Chip Yaras
Effects Editors: Jack Durney, Pete Grives, Karla McGregor, Kevin Spears
Music Editor: Denise O'Hara
Negative Cutting: Mary Nelson
Post Production Supervision: Lenore Nelson
Technical Supervision: Jerry Mills
Camera: Steve Altman, Charles Flekal, Curtis Hall, Dan Larsen, Raymond Lee, Ralph Migliori, Joe Ponticelle, Cliff Shirpser, Roy Wade, Jerry Whittington, Dave Valentine

Home video release
Miss Switch to the Rescue was released on a VHS titled The Miss Switch Mystery Special as a double feature with The Trouble with Miss Switch by Strand VCI Entertainment in 1991. To date, it has not been released on DVD by current rightsholder Warner Home Video.

See also
 The Trouble with Miss Switch
 List of Ruby-Spears productions
 ABC Weekend Special

References

External links
 
 

1982 television specials
1980s American animated films
1980s American television specials
1980s animated television specials
ABC Weekend Special
American Broadcasting Company television specials
American television shows based on children's books
Films directed by Charles August Nichols
Films scored by Dean Elliott
Television series about witchcraft
Ruby-Spears television specials